The National Jobs Council (NJC) of Singapore is a 17-member high-level council aimed at job creation and training, formed by the Government of Singapore in 2020. Chaired by Senior Minister and former Deputy Prime Minister Tharman Shanmugaratnam, the mission of the National Jobs Council is to identify and develop job opportunities and skills training for Singaporeans during the COVID-19 pandemic; it supports the "whole-of-nation approach" to preserve existing jobs and match Singaporeans with job openings.

History 
On 26 May 2020, Deputy Prime Minister Heng Swee Keat announced the plan to set up the National Jobs Council in his fourth Budget.

References 

Economic responses to the COVID-19 pandemic
Economy of Singapore
Labour in Singapore